Grummett is a surname. Notable people with the surname include:

Bill Grummett (1891–1967), Canadian politician
Jim Grummett (disambiguation), multiple people
Tom Grummett (born 1959), Canadian comics artist and penciller

See also
Grimmett
Grummet